Moon Chang-jin (born 12 July 1993) is a South Korean footballer who plays as a midfielder for Busan IPark.

Honours
Pohang Steelers
K League 1: 2013
Korean FA Cup: 2012, 2013

South Korea U20
AFC U-19 Championship: 2012

South Korea U23
AFC U-23 Championship runner-up: 2016

References

External links 
 
 Moon Chang-jin at KFA 
 

1993 births
Living people
Association football midfielders
South Korean footballers
Pohang Steelers players
Gangwon FC players
Shabab Al-Ahli Club players
K League 1 players
UAE Pro League players
Footballers at the 2016 Summer Olympics
Olympic footballers of South Korea
Expatriate footballers in the United Arab Emirates